Gladys Ascanio Arredondo (born 8 February 1941) is a Venezuelan pageant titleholder. She is the Miss Venezuela titleholder for 1960, and was the official representative of Venezuela to the Miss International 1960 pageant held in Long Beach, California, USA, on 12 August 1960, when she classified in the Top 15 semifinalists.

References

External links
Miss Venezuela Official Website
Miss International Official Website

1941 births
Living people
People from Caracas
Miss Venezuela winners
Miss International 1960 delegates